William Neil White (2 May 1920 – 19 February 1990) was a Scottish sportsman who played first-class cricket and field hockey. White was born at Troon, Ayrshire and died at Cambridge, Cambridgeshire.

Cricket
White was a right-handed batsman who bowled slow left-arm orthodox.

In 1947, White made his debut for Cambridgeshire in the Minor Counties Championship against Bedfordshire.  From 1947 to 1949, he represented the county in 11 Minor Counties matches, with his final match for the county coming against Lincolnshire.

He also played 2 first-class cricket matches for Cambridge University in 1948 against the Free Foresters and Gloucestershire. In his 2 first-class matches, he scored 19 runs at a batting average of 6.33, with a high score of 19.  With the ball, he took 4 wickets at bowling average of 26.50, with best figures of 4/16.

Field hockey
White represented Great Britain in field hockey at the 1948 Summer Olympics. A member of the British field hockey team which won the silver medal, he played four matches including the final, as forward.

References

External links
 
William White at Cricinfo
William White at CricketArchive
Profile

1920 births
1990 deaths
British male field hockey players
Olympic field hockey players of Great Britain
Field hockey players at the 1948 Summer Olympics
Olympic silver medallists for Great Britain
Olympic medalists in field hockey
People from Troon
Scottish cricketers
Cambridgeshire cricketers
Cambridge University cricketers
Alumni of the University of Cambridge
Medalists at the 1948 Summer Olympics
Sportspeople from South Ayrshire